Saatli Mosque is a mosque located in Shusha, Azerbaijan. It was under control of Armenian forces since the Capture of Shusha on May 8, 1992, until the city's recapture by Azerbaijan on 8 November 2020.

History
Saatli Mosque was built in 1883 in the same name neighbourhood of Shusha. Saatli is one of the upper neighbourhoods of Shusha established in the 19th century. Being another produce of prominent Azerbaijani architect Karbalayi Safikhan Karabakhi, the mosque and its minarets follow the design of earlier mosques of Shusha, Yukhari Govhar Agha Mosque, Ashaghi Govhar Agha Mosque and the Agdam Mosque in Aghdam. Saatli Mosque is considered one of the final masterpieces of Karbalayi Safikhan Karabakhi, built with two minarets. The mosque has a three-naved prayer hall and brick minaret with especially patterned decoration specific to architecture of Karabakh.

References

External links

Saatli Mosque after Armenian occupation
They are waiting for us. Page 3 Image before occupation
Karabakh Monuments

Mosques in Shusha
Mosques completed in 1883
19th-century mosques
Karbalayi Safikhan Karabakhi buildings and structures